Endamaghang is an administrative ward in the Karatu District of the Arusha Region of Tanzania. According to the 2012 census, the ward has a total population of 24,996.

References

Karatu District
Wards of Arusha Region